Samson and Delilah are Biblical
figures.

Samson and Delilah may also refer to:

In music
 Samson and Delilah (opera), an opera by Camille Saint-Saëns
 Samson & Delilah (album), released in 2013 by V V Brown
 "Samson and Delilah" (traditional song), a song most famously played by the Grateful Dead
 Samson and Delilah (Middle of the Road song)

Films
 Samson and Delilah (1922 film)
 Samson and Delilah (1949 film)
 Samson and Delilah (1984 film)
 Samson and Delilah (1985 film), nominated for the 1984 BAFTA Award for Best Short Film 
 Samson and Delilah (1996 film)
 Samson and Delilah (2009 film)

Art
 There have been many depictions in art, some listed here
 The subject is one of those commonly found in the Power of women trope in art and literature
 Samson and Delilah (painting), a painting by Peter Paul Rubens
 Samson and Delilah (van Dyck, London), a painting by Anthony van Dyck
 Samson and Delilah (van Dyck, Vienna), a painting by Anthony van Dyck
 Samson and Delilah (Guercino), a painting by Guercino

Other uses 
 Samson and Delilah (play), a 1911 play by Johannes Linnankoski
 "Samson and Delilah" (Terminator: The Sarah Connor Chronicles), an episode of the TV series Terminator: The Sarah Connor Chronicles
 Samson and Delilah, the club mascots of the Sunderland A.F.C. English football club
"Samson and Delilah" is a short story by D. H. Lawrence in his short story collection England, My England and Other Stories

See also
 Sansão e Dalila, a 2011 Brazilian miniseries
 "Simpson and Delilah", a 1990 episode of the TV series The Simpsons''
 "Sam and Delilah", a song by George and Ira Gershwin